"Gonna Make It" is the fourth single released by freestyle singer Sa-Fire from her 1988 eponymous debut.

Track listing
US 12" Single

Charts

References

1989 singles
Sa-Fire songs
1988 songs
Mercury Records singles